Arlan (Bashkir and ) is a rural locality (a selo) and the administrative centre of Arlansky Selsoviet, Krasnokamsky District, Bashkortostan, Russia. The population was 755 as of 2010. There are 15 streets.

Geography 
Arlan is located 22 km south of Nikolo-Beryozovka (the district's administrative centre) by road. Mozhary is the nearest rural locality.

References 

Rural localities in Krasnokamsky District